Raphael Okafor was an Anglican bishop in Nigeria: he was Bishop of Ihiala from 2008 until his retirement in 2016.

Okafor was born in Zaria on 7 August 1946.  He was educated at  the CMS school in  Awka-Etiti,  Emmanuel College, Owerri  and Trinity College, Bristol. He worked with the Scripture Union in Nigeria, becoming General Secretary in 1980. He was ordained deacon in 1989, priest in 1990.
He served in the Diocese of Enugu, rising to be a Canon and then an Archdeacon.

Notes

Living people
Anglican bishops of Ihiala
20th-century Anglican bishops in Nigeria
1946 births
Alumni of Trinity College, Bristol
People from Zaria
Emmanuel College, Owerri alumni
Church of Nigeria archdeacons